Mac Data Recovery Guru is a data recovery application, for macOS. It was designed to recover deleted files from hard disk drives, USB flash drives, memory cards of cameras and portable devices, MP3 players, PlayStations, X-Boxes, Wii's, palm devices and optical media.

Embedded file recovery 
Mac Data Recovery Guru has a “Search for embedded files” option that will make it do an exhaustive search for every file type it can recover starting from every byte on the drive, instead just searching for files starting at a block boundary. This is for use by digital forensics professionals.

Supported file systems 
macOS:
HFS, HFS+, HFSX

Microsoft:
NTFS, FAT

Linux:
Ext2, Ext3, Ext4, XFS, UFS

See also 
 Data recovery
 File deletion
 List of data recovery software

References

External links 
 

Data recovery software
Utilities for macOS